Ariaspes (died between 360 and 358 BC) was one of the three legitimate sons of Artaxerxes II of Persia. He was, after the death of his eldest brother Darius, driven to commit suicide by the intrigues of his other brother, Ochus. He was called "Ariarates" by the Roman historian Justin.

References

5th-century BC Iranian people 
4th-century BC Iranian people